Kara-Suu is a village in At-Bashy District of Naryn Region of Kyrgyzstan. Its population was 5,523 in 2021. European route E125 passes through the village. The settlement was established in 1929.

Population

References
 

Populated places in Naryn Region